Sardar Muhammad Yaqoob (سردار محمد یعقوب; died 20 October 2021) was a Pakistani politician who served as 16th Deputy Speaker of the National Assembly of Pakistan from 19 November 2002 to 15 November 2007.

References

Year of birth missing
20th-century births
2021 deaths
Pakistan Muslim League (Q) MNAs
Deputy Speakers of the National Assembly of Pakistan
Pakistani MNAs 2002–2007